Last Chance (formerly, Clifton and Caroline Diggings) is an unincorporated community in Placer County, California. It lies at an elevation of 4564 feet (1391 m).

Last Chance was named by miners. The Last Chance post office operated from 1865 to 1869 and from 1909 to 1919.

References

Unincorporated communities in California
Unincorporated communities in Placer County, California